The Men's 100 metre butterfly S8 event at the 2020 Paralympic Games took place on 3 September 2021, at the Tokyo Aquatics Centre.

Heats 
The swimmers with the top 8 times, regardless of heat, advanced to the final.

Heat 1 

Source:

Heat 2 

Source:

Final 

Source: 

Swimming at the 2020 Summer Paralympics